Elizabeth Allen Rosenbaum is an American film and television director. She is known for Purple Hearts, which became one of Netflix's most watched movies in 2022, musical Sneakerella for Disney Plus, and Ramona and Beezus for 20th Century Fox. In 2020, she directed and executive produced the pilot for the ice skating drama Spinning Out and episodes of the dark comedy Dead to Me.

Education
Elizabeth Allen Rosenbaum is a graduate of Cornell University. She attended graduate school at the University of Southern California.

Career
Rosenbaum made her directorial debut in 2006 with the teen romantic comedy Aquamarine, filmed on location in Australia. The film was nominated for two Teen Choice Awards for "Choice Breakout Female" and "Choice Chick Flick".

In 2010, Rosenbaum directed 20th Century Fox’s Ramona and Beezus, a family comedy adapted from children's book series by author Beverly Cleary. Rosenbaum was awarded that year's Women's Image Network Award for Best Female Director for the film.

Rosenbaum directed the 2015 Starz thriller Careful What You Wish For, starring Nick Jonas in his feature film debut.

In 2020, Rosenbaum directed and executive produced the Netflix series Spinning Out, about an elite single skater. Her other work in television has included directing individual episodes of Gossip Girl, Pretty Little Liars, All American, Guilt Why Women Kill, The Vampire Diaries and Dead to Me.

In 2022, Rosenbaum directed the original musical Disney+ film Sneakerella, a modern reimagining of the Cinderella fairy tale. She also became known for Purple Hearts, which became one of Netflix's most successful movies ever, but has received criticism as propaganda and for "propagating disturbing racist and misogynistic stereotypes". Rosenbaum acknowledged that the US military had demanded and received a rewrite of the script, but said, "I do hope that anyone who’s in any way insulted by it understands that our intentions are very pure, and it’s because we feel like people need to grow and need to start to become more moderate."

Rosenbaum has also taught filmmaking at USC.

Personal life and family 
Rosenbaum resides in Los Angeles and is a member of the DGA, the WGA, and the Editor's Guild. She is married to writer/producer Scott Rosenbaum. She adopted a child in 2014.

Filmography

Television
 Gossip Girl (2009)
 Life Unexpected (2010)
 The Vampire Diaries (2010)
 90210 (2011)
 Dating Rules from My Future Self (2012)
 Franklin & Bash (2012) 
 Emily Owens M.D. (2012)
 Star-Crossed (2014)
 Red Band Society (2014)
 The Kicks (2015)
 Mistresses (2015)
 Relationship Status (2016)
 Guilt (2016)
 The Arrangement (2017)
 MacGyver (2017)
 Famous in Love (2017)
 Empire (2017–2018)
 The Exorcist (2017)
 The Resident (2018)
 Hawaii Five-0 (2018)
 All American (2019)
 Pretty Little Liars: The Perfectionists (2019)
 BH90210 (2019)
 Why Women Kill (2019)
 Spinning Out (2020)
 Dead to Me (2020)

Film
 Eyeball Eddie (2001) (short film)
 Aquamarine (2006)
 Ramona and Beezus (2010)
 Careful What You Wish For (2015)
 Sneakerella (2022)
 Purple Hearts (2022)

Music videos
 Sofia Carson – "Come Back Home"  (2022)

References

External links
 Official website
 

American women film directors
American television directors
Cornell University alumni
American women television directors
Living people
People from Suffolk County, New York
USC School of Cinematic Arts alumni
Year of birth missing (living people)
Film directors from New York (state)
Ward Melville High School alumni
21st-century American women